John Mitchell "Jack" Gilpin (born May 31, 1951) is an American actor. He currently portrays Church the Butler in HBO's historical drama series The Gilded Age. He is the father of actress Betty Gilpin.

Early life 
Gilpin was born on May 31, 1951, in Boyce, Virginia, the son of Lucy Trumbull (Mitchell) and Kenneth Newcomer Gilpin, a businessman. His paternal great-grandfather was politician and general Lawrence Tyson. His maternal grandfather was World War I hero and aviation pioneer Gen. William "Billy" Mitchell. His first cousin is the former president of Harvard University from 2007 to 2018, Drew Gilpin Faust.

He is a graduate of Phillips Exeter Academy (class of 1969) and Harvard University (class of 1973). He studied acting at the Neighborhood Playhouse School of the theatre in New York City.

Career 
He had a recurring role on the TV series Kate & Allie, and is a frequent Law & Order guest star, having appeared in all of the first three series: Law & Order, Law & Order: Special Victims Unit, and Law & Order: Criminal Intent. Gilpin appeared in the films Heartburn, Something Wild, She-Devil, Revenge of the Nerds II: Nerds in Paradise, Quiz Show, Reversal of Fortune, Barcelona, and The Notorious Bettie Page. He is also an accomplished stage actor, including the Broadway production of Getting And Spending.

In 2008, Gilpin appeared in the fact-based film 21, playing the role of Bob Phillips who is interviewing student candidates for the fictional "Robinson Scholarship" to attend Harvard Medical School. Gilpin's character appears in the first scene of the film and his words set the stage for the movie's plot; he appears again in the final scene to bring closure to the film.

Personal life 
Gilpin is married to actress Ann McDonough, and is the father of actress Betty Gilpin, who stars in the Netflix series GLOW and also appeared on Law & Order, Fringe and Nurse Jackie.

Religious life 
Gilpin was ordained as priest of the Episcopal Church on December 15, 2012. He is currently in charge of St. John's Episcopal Church in New Milford, Connecticut, where he had arrived as a deacon two months prior to his ordination.  He had previously been a licensed lay preacher at Christ Church in his hometown of Roxbury, Connecticut.

Filmography

Film

Television

References

External links 
 
 
 

1951 births
American Episcopal priests
American male film actors
American male television actors
Harvard University alumni
Living people
People from Boyce, Virginia
Phillips Exeter Academy alumni
American male stage actors
20th-century American male actors
21st-century American male actors
Male actors from Virginia
21st-century Anglican priests
21st-century American clergy